was a Japanese professional shogi player who achieved the rank of 8-dan (which was the highest dan level during his time).

He was a Lifetime Meijin who won the title eight times. At the time, the Meijin title was the only shogi title.

Gallery

References

External links
将棋DB2:  1952-07-12 名人戦 大山康晴 vs 木村義雄

Japanese shogi players
Deceased professional shogi players
Recipients of the Medal with Purple Ribbon
Recipients of the Order of the Rising Sun, 3rd class
Professional shogi players from Tokyo
Meijin (shogi)
Lifetime titles
People from Sumida
1905 births
1986 deaths